The Minorca, is a breed of domestic chicken originating in the Mediterranean island of Menorca, in the Balearic Islands to the south-east of Spain. It is a well-known exhibition bird in many countries of the world, but in the island of Menorca is an endangered breed and considered to be at risk of extinction.

History

The international type of Minorca was created by the British from indigenous Menorcan birds. This process began during the British occupation of the island from 1708 to 1783, but It is not clear if it took place there or in Britain. It is likely that it began in Menorca and continued in Britain, where imports of chickens from Menorca in the 1780s are documented. By about 100 years later, the breed (which was considered a variety of the "Spanish") was common and long-established in Devon and Cornwall, in the south-west of England, where it was highly regarded as an egg-laying breed. It had been exhibited in Paris, under the name "Barbezieux", and was widespread in the world. It reached Germany in the late 1870s, and was added to the Standard of Perfection of the American Poultry Association in 1888. 

Various attempts were made to modify some of the physical characteristics of the breed, including body size (by cross-breeding with the Langshan), the size of the comb and earlobes, and the position of the neck. None of these attempts had any beneficial effect on its abilities as an egg-layer.

Until recently the Minorca was uncommon in its island of origin. In 2004 a project to assess the numbers and quality of the remaining stock in the farms and country houses of the island was completed at the Centre de Capacitació i Experiències Agràries de Mao, the agricultural college of Mahón, and the results published in 2006. A breeding flock selected for quality and consisting of 30 cocks and 150 hens was established at the college, and 600 birds distributed to local breeders.

In 2012 a programme of conservation and improvement of the Minorca  breed was approved, to be managed by the Associació de Gallines Menorquines, the association of breeders of the chicken in Menorca island. 

The Minorca is listed by the Ministerio de Agricultura, Alimentación y Medio Ambiente, the Spanish ministry of agriculture, among the indigenous breeds at risk of extinction. The population in Spain at the end of 2012 was 460 birds; all were in the Balearic Islands.

Characteristics

In Spain, the Minorca is a breed of medium size, with uniformly glossy greenish-black plumage. The comb, face and wattles are bright red. The comb is smooth and single, with six well-defined points; it is erect in cocks, but in hens falls to one side. The wattles are large, smooth and fine-textured. The earlobes are white, very large, and oval or almond-shaped. The skin is white and the legs black or dark slate-coloured.

The British Poultry Standards call for a higher weight, in the range  for both cocks and hens. In the United Kingdom blue and white colour varieties of the Minorca are recognised, and in some other countries there are buff and barred varieties. Rose-combed variants are recognised in several countries, not including Spain. There is also a Minorca bantam, which in some countries may also be rose-combed.

Use

The Minorca is often kept as an ornamental breed. As a farm bird, it is an egg-laying breed. Hens start laying early, at about 26 weeks, and give about 120 white eggs per year.

References

Conservation Priority Breeds of the Livestock Conservancy
Chicken breeds originating in Spain
Animal breeds on the RBST Watchlist
Animal breeds on the GEH Red List
Chicken breeds